Sailer may refer to:

 Sailer (surname)
 Sailer butterflies: the butterfly genera Neptis (typical sailers) and Pseudoneptis (blue sailers)

See also 
 Seiler
 Sailor (disambiguation)
 Saylor